Maxime Françoise Jean Giron (born 15 September 1994) is a French football player. He plays in Italy for  club Crotone.

Club career
He made his Serie B debut for Avellino on 6 September 2015 in a game against Salernitana.

On 25 January 2019, he returned to Bisceglie.

On 9 January 2020 he signed with Serie C club Modena until the end of the 2019–20 season. After one more season with Bisceglie ending with relegation, Giron successively spent the 2021–22 season with Palermo, being part of the lineup that won promotion to Serie B through playoffs. On 27 July 2022, he successively left Palermo to join recently-relegated Serie C club Crotone.

Career statistics

Club

References

External links
 

1994 births
People from Gonesse
Living people
French footballers
A.C. Montichiari players
S.S. Chieti Calcio players
U.S. Avellino 1912 players
A.S. Melfi players
A.C. Reggiana 1919 players
S.S. Juve Stabia players
Potenza Calcio players
A.S. Bisceglie Calcio 1913 players
Modena F.C. players
Palermo F.C. players
F.C. Crotone players
Serie D players
Tercera División players
Serie B players
Serie C players
French expatriate footballers
Expatriate footballers in Italy
Expatriate footballers in Spain
French expatriate sportspeople in Italy
French expatriate sportspeople in Spain
Association football defenders
Footballers from Val-d'Oise